Pelican Lake is a small lake in the southern portion of the Point Reyes National Seashore, northwest of Bolinas. Pelican Lake is one of the five Coast Trail Lakes, along with Bass Lake, Crystal Lake, Ocean Lake and Wildcat Lake.

Geology
As with the other nearby lakes in the southeast portion of the Point Reyes peninsula, Pelican Lake occupies a natural synclinal depression formed behind blocks of rock displaced by landslides within the past 10,000 years. The rocks involved in the landslide are shale, chert and sandstone, some similar to Miocene rocks of the Monterey Formation and others to Pliocene rocks from the Central Coast Ranges. The process that caused these slides is ongoing, with several nearby slides caused by the 1906 San Francisco earthquake and others as recently as 1956.

Prior to geological research in the 1960s, the area was considered to be sufficiently stable for the United States Army to construct an underground artillery control facility within the North Point headland directly west of Pelican Lake in 1944. These concrete structures were filled in by the National Park Service after it assumed control of the area, but could be exposed by future landslides.

Ecology
The lake is within the Southern Inverness Ridge region of the Point Reyes National Seashore, in an area of coastal scrub and grassland. In this coastal zone there are open stands of coyote brush (Baccharis pilularis), often with native grasses such as California oatgrass (Danthonia californica) and purple needlegrass (Nassella pulchra). The other dominant plants in this ecosystem are California sage brush (Artemisia californica), black sage (Salvia mellifera), sticky monkeyflower (Mimulus guttatus), poison oak (Toxicodendron diversilobum), California coffeeberry (Frangula californica) and tree lupine (Lupinus arboreus).

Around Pelican Lake and the neighboring lakes are thick growths of willow (Salix sp.) In the lake margins can be found common tule (Schoenoplectus acutus), California bulrush (Schoenoplectus californicus), cat-tail (Typha latifolia) and sedges (Carex sp. including Carex senta). The lake has been stocked with warm-water game fish.

On the slopes above the coastal lakes, the flora is characterized by stands of Douglas fir (Pseudotsuga menziesii).

Pelican Lake is adjacent to the  Double Point Area of Special Biological Significance, established in 1974 primarily to protect the large population of harbor seals (Phoca vitulina) that raise pups on the beach between April and June each year.

See also
 List of lakes in the San Francisco Bay Area
 List of lakes in California

References

Sources
 
 
 
 
 
 
 
 

Lakes of Marin County, California
Lakes of California
Wetlands of the San Francisco Bay Area